The Institute of Business Administration of the University of Rajshahi, commonly known as IBA RU is a leading business school in Bangladesh. It is the second largest business school in Bangladesh.

History
The BBA program was started in 2015 at the institute.

Academic programs
Undergraduate
BBA
Graduate
MBA (Regular)
MBA (Day)
MBA (Evening)
MBA (for BBA Graduate)
EMBA
MPhil
PhD

References

External links
 Official website
 IBA

University of Rajshahi